Ponce may refer to:

Ponce (surname)

Ponce, Puerto Rico, a city in Puerto Rico
 Ponce High School
 Ponce massacre, 1937
USS Ponce, several ships of the US Navy
Manuel Ponce, a Mexican composer active in the 20th century
 British slang for a procurer of prostitutes, also used figuratively to refer to an effeminate man.

See also
Ponce Inlet, Florida, a town in Florida, US
Ponce de León (disambiguation)
Ponce de Leon, Florida, a town in Florida, US
Ponce de Leon, Missouri, an unincorporated community in Missouri, US
Ponce de Leon Avenue, Atlanta, Georgia, US
Ponce de Leon Bay, a bay in Florida, US
Ponce de Leon Springs State Recreation Area, Holmes County, Florida, US